USS Mount Washington was a steamer purchased by the Union Navy during the American Civil War. She was used by the Union Navy as a gunboat assigned to patrol Confederate waterways.

The side wheel gunboat Mount Vernon, built at Philadelphia, Pennsylvania, in 1846, was seized by order of the War Department 21 April 1861 and transferred to the Navy on that date for active duty with the Potomac Flotilla, Lt. J. Glendy Sprosteon in command.

Assigned to duty on the Potomac River to protect Washington, D.C. 

After fitting out at the Washington Navy Yard (striking the wharf in the process), Mount Vernon was ready for duty. In May she reconnoitered the Potomac River and up the Rappahannock River 16 May to Urbana, meeting no southern forces. She chased a steamer 16 May and noted, the 18th, that people on shore were most mistrustful. During the summer, she served as a utility boat. Dispatched 26 June to seize a small sloop convoying armed men from the Maryland to Virginia shores, she departed the Washington Navy Yard 28 June for Fortress Monroe. She carried troops to Aiken's Landing 17 August.

Change of name to USS Mount Washington 

In this area for the remainder of 1861, Mount Vernon changed her name to Mount Washington 4 November 1861 to prevent confusion. She carried provisions for the squadron in 1862, arriving Norfolk, Virginia, from Washington, D.C., 12 July with ordnance stores. She towed  to Hampton Roads, Virginia, 24 December 1862.

Heavy action encountered in Virginia waterways 

Mount Washington saw heaviest action in 1863 in the Siege of Suffolk, Virginia. She towed  to Washington 8 January, joining the campaign in April. She found  aground at the mouth of the Nampony River 13 April and learned that the Confederates planned to cross the river to attack the Union's rear forces at Suffolk, Virginia, and to silence the gunboats for this purpose. In the subsequent Battle of Suffolk at the Norfleet House Battery, Mount Washington exchanged artillery fire with the Confederates at Hampton Roads, 14 April, meeting sharp musketry. Four sailors temporarily assigned to Mount Washington were awarded the Medal of Honor for their actions during this battle: Coxswain Robert Jordan, Seaman Henry Thielberg, Coxswain Robert B. Wood, and Seaman Samuel Woods. Later in April, she and Stepping Stones were fired on at Norfleet's Point. Towing West End downriver, Mount Washington ran aground but moved off with the next high tide. Four Negroes boarded her a few days later, reporting no sign of Confederates; nevertheless, Mount Washington was fired on moments later, and a severe engagement ensued.

Severely damaged, Mount Washington continues her work 

After this venture, Mount Washington moved to the mouth of the Western Branch, 6 May, where she was completely riddled and disabled. Participating in the naval action against the batteries at Hatt's Point 12 May nearly destroyed her. She joined the North Atlantic Blockading Squadron at Norfolk, Virginia, 25 February 1865.

End-of-war decommissioning, sale, and civilian career 

In April, she served as supply ship downriver until decommissioning. She was sold at public auction at Baltimore, Maryland, 21 June 1865. Redocumented 18 October 1865, she continued to serve American commerce until 1880.

References  

Naval Historical Center

Ships of the Union Navy
Ships built in Philadelphia
Steamships of the United States Navy
Gunboats of the United States Navy
1846 ships